J & W Dudgeon was a Victorian shipbuilding and engineering company based in Cubitt Town, London, founded by John and William Dudgeon.

John and William Dudgeon had established the Sun Iron Works in Millwall in the 1850s, and had a reputation for advanced marine engines. In 1862 they set up as shipbuilders at a yard to the south of Cubitt Town Pier. They initially specialised in building blockade runners for the American Civil War, at times employing up to 1500 men.

The first ship built there was the 150-foot Flora, the first twin-screw steamer to cross the Atlantic Ocean. The firm survived the 1866 crash of Overend Gurney, with enough orders to take over the disused yard to the south in 1869.

In 1874 the company was severely damaged by the bungled launching of the large warship Independencia for the Brazilian government, repairs and refitting eventually being done by Samuda Brothers, just down the river. The ship was eventually acquired by the Royal Navy, as HMS Neptune. William Dudgeon died in 1875 and the yard closed. John Dudgeon was subsequently judged to be 'of unsound mind' and was admitted to an asylum in Edinburgh.

By 1882 the site had become an oil storage wharf, with tanks below ground level. By 1913 it had 27 oil storage tanks with a combined capacity of over 14,000 tons. It remained in this use until the 1960s, by which time it had nearly 100 tanks, some of 20,000 gallons.

In 1969 an explosion in an oil storage tank being demolished at the site (then known as Dudgeon's wharf) killed five firemen.

The site was later developed for housing and is known as Compass Point.

Ships

References

External links
 
 List of Dudgeon ships

History of the London Borough of Tower Hamlets
Shipbuilding in London
Ships built in Cubitt Town
Shipyards on the River Thames
Port of London